Serhiy Daniv (born 2 October 1975) is a Ukrainian soccer midfielder and coach who has spent most of his career in the United States.

Born in Kalush, Ukraine, Daniv spent his senior year of high school in Philadelphia where he completed his college admissions test. He attended Wake Forest University, where he was an All-American for the university's soccer team in 1995, 1996 and 1998. He was a U-14, U-15, and U-16 USSR National Soccer Team player before heading to Winston-Salem, N.C. to play for the Demon Deacons. In addition to his three All-America honors, Daniv was an All-ACC First Team pick in both 1996 and 1998 and an All-ACC Second Team selection as a freshman in 1995. He also garnered All-South Region accolades during those three seasons. He appeared in 45 matches for the Burn and the Fire from 1999 until 2004, making 37 starts along the way. Daniv helped the Burn advance to the 1999 MLS Western Conference Finals, a year in which he was a candidate for league Rookie of the Year honors, and had a 2001 campaign for the Fire in which he posted seven points in 14 matches.

References

External links
 
 
 
 

1975 births
Living people
Ukrainian emigrants to the United States
FC Dallas players
Chicago Fire FC players
Major League Soccer players
Association football midfielders
Ukrainian footballers
Ukrainian expatriate footballers
Expatriate soccer players in the United States
FC Skala Stryi (1911) players
People from Kalush, Ukraine
Sportspeople from Ivano-Frankivsk Oblast